Alberto Piccinini (25 January 1923 – 14 April 1972) was an Italian professional footballer who played as a midfielder. He was regarded as one of the first liberos when Gipo Viani, his coach at Salernitana pulled him back to defence and assigned him to mark the opposition's number 9.

Honours
Juventus
 Serie A champion: 1949–50, 1951–52.

External links
 

1923 births
1972 deaths
Italian footballers
Italy international footballers
Serie A players
Delfino Pescara 1936 players
A.S. Roma players
U.S. Salernitana 1919 players
Palermo F.C. players
Juventus F.C. players
A.C. Milan players
Association football midfielders